Kadene Vassell (born 29 January 1989) is a Jamaican-born Dutch athlete, who competes in the sprint with personal best times of 11.42 seconds at the 100 m and 23.49 seconds at the 200 m event.

Vassell won the silver medal at the 2012 European Athletics Championships in Helsinki at the 4 × 100 m relay.

External links 
 

1989 births
Living people
Dutch female sprinters
Athletes (track and field) at the 2012 Summer Olympics
Dutch people of Jamaican descent
European Athletics Championships medalists
Olympic athletes of the Netherlands
People from Saint Thomas Parish, Jamaica
Olympic female sprinters